Teboho Mathibeli (born 2 December 1970) is a Lesotho boxer. He competed in the men's flyweight event at the 1988 Summer Olympics.

References

1970 births
Living people
Lesotho male boxers
Olympic boxers of Lesotho
Boxers at the 1988 Summer Olympics
Place of birth missing (living people)
Flyweight boxers